Red Windsor is a pale cream English cheddar cheese from Leicestershire, made using pasteurised cow's milk marbled with a wine, often a Bordeaux wine or a blend of port wine and brandy.

Red Windsor is produced by Long Clawson Dairy, based in Long Clawson, Leicestershire.

References

English cheeses
Cow's-milk cheeses